Get to Know You may refer to:

"Get to Know You", a song by Baboon from Ed Lobster
Get to Know You, an extended play by Jai Waetford
"Like to Get to Know You", a song by Spanky and Our Gang
Like to Get to Know You (album), its parent album
"Wanna Get to Know You", a song by G-Unit from the album Beg for Mercy

See also
Getting to Know You (disambiguation)